The 31st parallel south is a circle of latitude that is 31 degrees south of the Earth's equatorial plane. It crosses the Atlantic Ocean, Africa, the Indian Ocean, Australasia, the Pacific Ocean and South America.

At this latitude the sun is visible for 14 hours, 13 minutes during the December solstice and 10 hours, 04 minutes during the June solstice.

Around the world
Starting at the Prime Meridian and heading eastwards, the parallel 31° south passes through:

{| class="wikitable plainrowheaders"
! scope="col" width="125" | Co-ordinates
! scope="col" | Country, territory or ocean
! scope="col" | Notes
|-
| style="background:#b0e0e6;" | 
! scope="row" style="background:#b0e0e6;" | Atlantic Ocean
| style="background:#b0e0e6;" |
|-valign="top"
| 
! scope="row" | 
| Northern Cape - for about 20 km Western Cape Northern Cape Eastern Cape KwaZulu-Natal - for about 13 km
|-
| style="background:#b0e0e6;" | 
! scope="row" style="background:#b0e0e6;" | Indian Ocean
| style="background:#b0e0e6;" |
|-valign="top"
| 
! scope="row" | 
| Western Australia South Australia New South Wales
|-
| style="background:#b0e0e6;" | 
! scope="row" style="background:#b0e0e6;" | Pacific Ocean
| style="background:#b0e0e6;" |
|-
| 
! scope="row" | 
| Coquimbo Region
|-
| 
! scope="row" | 
| San Juan ProvinceLa Rioja ProvinceCórdoba ProvinceSanta Fe ProvinceEntre Ríos Province
Passing near the cities of Paraná (31°44′S 60°32′W) and Santa Fe (31°38′S 60°42′W). 
|-
| 
! scope="row" | 
|
|-
| 
! scope="row" | 
| Rio Grande do Sul - for about 13 km
|-
| 
! scope="row" | 
|
|-
| 
! scope="row" | 
| Rio Grande do Sul
|-
| style="background:#b0e0e6;" | 
! scope="row" style="background:#b0e0e6;" | Atlantic Ocean
| style="background:#b0e0e6;" |
|}

See also
30th parallel south
32nd parallel south

s31